The North of Scotland Cup is a knock-out tournament for football teams in membership of the North of Scotland Football Association. The teams involved are based in the Highlands and Moray and membership consists of senior clubs from the Scottish Professional Football League (SPFL), Highland Football League and North Caledonian League.

Winners

Club performance

References

 
Football cup competitions in Scotland
Football in Highland (council area)
Sport in Inverness
Football in Moray